Events in the year 2012 in Bulgaria.

Incumbents 

 President: Rosen Plevneliev
 Prime Minister: Boyko Borisov

Events 
May 22: A magnitude 5.6 earthquake struck 24 km west of Bulgaria's capital Sofia, at a depth of 9.4 km. A citizen died from heart attack, several buildings were damaged.
July 18: An explosion has killed at least seven people on a bus carrying Israeli tourists in the eastern Bulgarian city of Burgas. More than 20 people were also injured when the bus exploded at Burgas airport, by the Black Sea.

Deaths
November 6: Maxim of Bulgaria, 98, patriarch of the Bulgarian Orthodox Church. (born 1914)

References 

2012 in Bulgaria
2010s in Bulgaria
Years of the 21st century in Bulgaria
Bulgaria
Bulgaria